Zollfeld is a slightly ascending plain in Carinthia, Austria. It is one of the oldest cultural landscapes in the East Alpine region.

Geography
It is situated in the larger Klagenfurt Basin of the Central Eastern Alps and extends along the Glan River from north of Klagenfurt to Sankt Veit an der Glan.

The plain is confined by surrounded by four prominent peaks of the basin: the Ulrichsberg in the south and the Magdalensberg in the east as well as the Gößeberg and the Lorenziberg in the north. Since about 500 years the mountains are stops on the annual Vierbergelauf procession celebrated on second Friday after Easter.

History

The oldest archaeological findings at Magdalensberg originate from the time of Hallstatt culture (8th to 6th centuries BCE). The area was the cultural and political centre of the Celtic kingdom and the later Roman province of Noricum, when under the rule of Emperor Claudius (41-54 AD) the city of Virunum was established as the province's capital, replacing - or maybe identical with - ancient Noreia.

Following the Slavic settlement of the Eastern Alps about 600, the Karnburg (Krnski grad) fortress became the center of the Principality of Carantania, which about 740 was vassalized by Duke Odilo of Bavaria. With Bavaria, a part of the Carolingian Empire under Charlemagne from 788 onwards, a Kaiserpfalz at Karnburg was erected about 830. It remained the administrative center after the Duchy of Carinthia had been split off Bavaria in 976.

Inside the castle was a meeting place, where the Prince's Stone, the base of an ancient Roman Ionic column, stood and the Dukes of Carantania were installed. Near Maria Saal stands the Duke's Chair, where the newly installed dukes distributed their land among the vassals.

See also 
Modestus (Apostle of Carinthia)
Carantanians
History of Slovenia

Geography of Carinthia (state)
Carantania